Gunner, the Gunner, Gunners or the Gunners may refer to:

Places
 Gunner Bay, Bermuda
 Gunner River, New Zealand
 Gunners Park and Shoebury Ranges, a nature reserve in Essex, England
 Gunners Pond, Newfoundland and Labrador, Canada
 Mount Gunner, Ross Dependency, Antarctica

People
 Gunner (name), a list of people with the nickname, given name or surname
 Gunner, a nickname used by rapper Machine Gun Kelly (rapper)
 Gunner (wrestler), professional wrestler Chad Lail (born 1982)
 Gunner Scott, ring name of retired professional wrestler Brent Albright (born 1978)
 Gunner (student), a slang term in medical or law school for a hyper-competitive student
 Gunner, a nickname for Guns N' Roses fans

Military

Rank or role
 Gunner (artillery), a member of the crew operating a crew-served weapon, such as an artillery piece
 Gunner (rank), a rank equivalent to private in a Commonwealth artillery corps
 Gunner, formerly a gunnery warrant officer of the British Royal Navy or Royal Marines
 Gunner, in armored, reconnaissance or mechanized units, a soldier who occupies a dedicated gun position in a military vehicle
 Gunner, in infantry platoons, a specialist trained in using machine guns or automatic rifles
 Air gunner, or aerial gunner, a member of an aircrew who operates a machine gun or auto-cannon
 Infantry weapons officer, commonly referred to as gunner, a non-technical chief warrant officer in the United States Marine Corps

Other
 Fairchild AT-21 Gunner, an American World War II specialized bomber crew trainer
 Gunner (dog), a dog noted for his ability to hear Japanese air raids approaching Darwin, Australia, in the Second World War
 The Gunners, a nickname for the British Royal Artillery

Sports

Teams
 Albuquerque Gunners, a former name (1987-1989) of the defunct New Mexico Chiles soccer club
 Ballygunner GAA, Waterford, Ireland 
 Canberra Gunners, an Australian basketball team based in Canberra
 Charleston Gunners, a short-lived Premier Basketball League team based in Charleston, West Virginia
 Edinburgh Gunners, nickname and former official name for Edinburgh Rugby, a Scottish rugby team
 Ellesmere Port Gunners, a defunct English speedway team in Ellesmere Port, Wirral (1972-1985)
 Fredericksburg Gunners, a defunct American soccer team based in Fredericksburg, Virginia (2006-2009)
 Garrison Gunners, one of the two teams in the Isles of Scilly Football League
 Gunners F.C., a Zimbabwean football club based in Harare
 Oberwart Gunners, a basketball club based in Oberwart, Austria
 Puget Sound Gunners FC, a defunct American soccer team based in Issaquah, Washington (2010-2015)
 St. Louis Gunners, a former independent football based in St. Louis, Missouri, that briefly played in the National Football League
 The Gunners, nickname for Arsenal F.C., a London football club

Position
 Gunner (American football), an American football player tasked with sprinting to tackle a kick returner

Arts and entertainment
 "Gunner" (The Punisher episode)", an episode of The Punisher
 Gunner Henderson, a fictional character appearing in The Punisher television series
 The Gunner, a 1928 crime novel by Edgar Wallace

Other uses
 Gunner (cocktail)
 Gunner and Company, the last provincial private bank in the United Kingdom, bought out in 1953

See also
 Gunnar, a given name
 Gunnery (disambiguation)
 The Gunners (disambiguation)